The 1900–01 Ottawa Hockey Club season was the team's 16th season of play. The club won the 1901 Canadian Amateur Hockey League (CAHL) championship, but did not challenge for the Stanley Cup.

Regular season
The club went undefeated through the season, but because the Montreal Shamrocks lost a Stanley Cup challenge to the Winnipeg Victorias, Ottawa did not win the Cup as a result of league play. At first, Ottawa was intending to challenge Winnipeg for the Cup, but on February 27, 1901, announced that they would not do so that winter. According to Coleman(1966), Ottawa did not issue a challenge due to the "lateness of the season." The Ottawa Journal as reported in The Globe suggested that the Ottawa club was wise in their decision, as they were in "racked condition in which they are, as a result of the immensely hard exertions put forth by them in all their games this season". The Ottawa Hockey Club did not challenge the following season, either.

Results

Player statistics

Leading scorers

Goaltending averages

Awards and records

Transactions

Roster
 Fred Chittick
 Bouse Hutton
 William Duval
 Herbert Henry
 James "Jim" McGee
 J. Mac Roger
 Arthur E. Sixsmith
 Jack Smith
 Charlie Spittal
 Harvey Pulford
 Harry Westwick

Source: Kitchen(2008), p. 342

See also
 1901 CAHL season

References

Ottawa Senators (original) seasons
Ottawa